Mr. & Mrs. '55 is a 1955 Indian romantic comedy film directed and produced by Guru Dutt, from a screenplay written by Abrar Alvi. A socially critical film set in urban Mumbai, it stars Madhubala as Anita Verma, a naive heiress who is forced into a marriage with an unemployed cartoonist (Guru Dutt) to save her millions.

Mr. & Mrs. '55 was among the early works of Dutt, and was also one of the few comedies made by him. Upon its theatrical release on 11 February 1955, the film emerged as a major critical and commercial success.  Its box-office victory marked a reversal of fortunes for Madhubala, who was one of the film stars deemed "box office poison" in 1954. Her portrayal of Anita Verma has been generally considered one of her most memorable and identifiable performances.

In 2019, Time Out placed it at the 57th place in the list of "The 100 Best Bollywood movies". The movie was appreciated for its comic sequences but was criticised for its problematic portrayal of feminism and progressive themes.

Plot 

Preetam (Guru Dutt), a struggling cartoonist, meets Anita (Madhubala) at a tennis match, where she is watching her favourite tennis star. Anita, a wealthy and westernised heiress, is controlled by her aunt, Seeta Devi (Lalita Pawar). Seeta is suspicious of men and cultivates her attitudes in Anita. However, to receive her fortune, her father's will decrees that Anita must marry within one month of turning 21. Seeta Devi doesn't agree with this and tries to set Anita up with a sham marriage which will soon lead to divorce, thereby giving her both freedom and a fortune. Seeta hires Preetam to marry Anita, but she doesn't know that the pair have already met. Preetam is kept from Anita after their marriage, but he kidnaps her and takes her to the traditional house of his brother.

While at the house, Anita befriends Preetam's sister-in-law, and she begins to see the merit in becoming a wife. Preetam is worried that he has lost Anita and expedites their divorce by providing false, incriminating evidence to the court. Preetam then leaves Mumbai, heartbroken. Anita now recognises her feelings for Preetam and rushes to meet him at the airport. In the end, the couple is reunited.

Cast 

 Madhubala as Anita Verma
 Guru Dutt as Preetam Kumar
 Lalita Pawar as Seeta Devi (Anita's Aunt)
 Johnny Walker as Johny
 Yasmin as Julie
 Kumkum as Preetam's Bhabhi
 Uma Devi as Lily D'Silva
 Radhika as Moni
 Anwari as Anita's Nanny
 Agha
 Haroon as Advocate 
 Rooplaxmi as Seeta Devi's follower 
 Moni Chatterji as Judge
 Al-Nasir as Ramesh, tennis player
 Bir Sakhuja as Mr. Sharma, editor
 Cuckoo as singer in the song "Neele Aasmani"
 Jagdeep as paper boy
 Chandrashekhar Dubey as Doctor
 Moolchand as husband of the lady in theater
 Rooplaxmi as toy seller singer

Production 
The cartoons in the film were drawn by R. K. Laxman.

The initial choice for playing Anita Verma, the main character of the film, was Shyama. Guru Dutt had approached her as she was his leading lady in the highly successful Aar Paar (1954), but Shyama demanded a high fee and he refused. Dutt then contacted Vyjayanthimala, who rejected the role due to her hectic schedule and later recalled it as her "worst decision ever" in 2011. It was then when Madhubala was chosen to play the leading lady in the film.

Soundtrack 
The music of this movie was composed by O. P. Nayyar and Majrooh Sultanpuri was the lyricist.

The song "Preetam Aan Milo" was originally sung by C. H. Atma in 1945 as a non-filmly song. Nayyar, having liked that song, included it in the film and it was sung by Geeta Dutt. The song Neela Aasmani was sampled by  American rapper 2 Chainz and 42 Dugg in song Million Dollars Worth of Game.

Critical reception 

Filmfare, in its May 1955 issue quoted : "A thoroughly delightful, honey and cream social comedy. Mr. & Mrs. '55 is a model of film craft and has gripping interest for every class of cinegoer. Its satire of characters we know and its incidents taken from life are spiced with humour... the dialogue, well-written, tense and witty, enhances the appeal of this true-to-life and thought-provoking entertainer."

Harneet Singh of The Indian Express wrote, "The film rides on Madhubala's impish charm and breezy comic timing, Johnny Walker's one-liners, O. P. Nayyar's evergreen music and Dutt's lyrical direction, replete with long tracking shots, close-ups and cinematographer V. K. Murthy's exquisite shadow-and-light framing [...] Mr. and Mrs. 55 is a great ride till the time the film doesn't go all sanskari. Alvi's dialogues are the star of the narrative. The banter is funny, lifelike and refreshingly non-filmi."

Box office 
Mr. & Mrs. '55 was the fifth highest-grossing Indian film of 1955.

References

External links 

1950s Hindi-language films
1955 films
Indian romantic comedy films
Films directed by Guru Dutt
Films with screenplays by Abrar Alvi
Films scored by O. P. Nayyar
1955 romantic comedy films
Indian black-and-white films